Ionuț Stănescu (born 14 August 1979 in Brașov) is a retired Romanian handballer who last played for HC Dobrogea Sud Constanța.

For his services to the team and the city, and his exemplary sportsmanship conduct, Stănescu was made Honorary Citizen of Constanța in 2010.

Achievements
Liga Națională:
Winner: 2004, 2006, 2007, 2009, 2010, 2011, 2012
Cupa României:
Winner: 2006, 2011, 2012
EHF Cup Winners' Cup:
Semifinalist: 2006
Quarterfinalist: 2007, 2009
EHF Challenge Cup:
Semifinalist: 2004

Individual awards
 Romanian Handballer of the Year: 2006, 2007

References

1979 births
Living people
Sportspeople from Brașov
HC Dobrogea Sud Constanța players
Romanian male handball players